Yale Yeastman "Tod" Sloan (December 24, 1890 – September 12, 1956) was an outfielder for the St. Louis Browns in parts of three seasons (1913, 1917 and 1919).

Sloan played in 143 games and had 402 At Bats, 43 Runs, 94 Hits, 8 Doubles, 5 Triples, 2 Home Runs, 33 RBI, 9 Stolen Bases, 41 Walks, .234 Batting Average, .319 On-base percentage, .294 Slugging Percentage, 118 Total Bases and 7 Sacrifice Hits.

Sloan died in Akron, Ohio, at the age of 65.

Sources

1890 births
1956 deaths
St. Louis Browns players
Major League Baseball right fielders
Baseball players from Tennessee
Montgomery Rebels players
Nashville Vols players
Birmingham Barons players
Rochester Hustlers players
Columbus Senators players
Chattanooga Lookouts players
Memphis Chickasaws players
Macon Peaches players
People from Madisonville, Tennessee